Kitsman Raion was an administrative raion (district) in the northern part of Chernivtsi Oblast, in the historical region of Bukovina, in western Ukraine. The administrative center was the city of Kitsman. The raion was abolished on 18 July 2020 as part of the administrative reform of Ukraine, which reduced the number of raions of Chernivtsi Oblast to three. The area of Kitsman Raion was split between Chernivtsi Raion and Vyzhnytsia Raion. The last estimate of the raion population was 

At the time of disestablishment, the raion consisted of five hromadas:
 Brusnytsia rural hromada with the administration in the selo of Brusnytsia, transferred to Vyzhnytsia Raion;
 Kitsman urban hromada with the administration in Kitsman, transferred to Chernivtsi Raion;
 Mamaivtsi rural hromada with the administration in the selo of Mamaivtsi, transferred to Chernivtsi Raion;
 Nepolokivtsi settlement hromada with the administration in the urban-type settlement of Nepolokivtsi, transferred to Chernivtsi Raion;
 Stavchany urban hromada with the administration in the selo of Stavchany, transferred to Chernivtsi Raion.

See also
Subdivisions of Ukraine

References

External links
  Web page on the website of Regional State Administration 

Former raions of Chernivtsi Oblast
1940 establishments in Ukraine
Ukrainian raions abolished during the 2020 administrative reform